Jean-Paul Étienne Dreyfus, better known as Jean-Paul Le Chanois (25 October 1909 – 8 July 1985), was a French film director, screenwriter and actor. His film ...Sans laisser d'adresse won the Golden Bear (Comedies) award at the 1st Berlin International Film Festival.

Selected filmography

 España (1936)
 The Time of the Cherries (1938)
 Girl with Grey Eyes (1945)
 Her Final Role (1946)
 Dilemma of Two Angels (1948)
 Without Leaving an Address (1951)
 Matrimonial Agency (1952)
 The House on the Dune (1952)
 Alarm in Morocco (1953)
 Papa, maman, la bonne et moi (1954)
 Papa, maman, ma femme et moi (1955)
 The Case of Doctor Laurent (1957)
 Les Misérables (1958)
 Mandrin (1962)
 Monsieur (1964)
 The Gardener of Argenteuil (1966)

References

External links

1909 births
1985 deaths
20th-century French male actors
French film directors
French male screenwriters
20th-century French screenwriters
French male film actors
Male actors from Paris
Directors of Golden Bear winners
20th-century French male writers
20th-century pseudonymous writers